Saint-Léon-d'Issigeac (literally Saint-Léon of Issigeac; Languedocien: Sent Leu de Sijac) is a commune in the Dordogne department in Nouvelle-Aquitaine in southwestern France.

Population

See also
Communes of the Dordogne department

References

Communes of Dordogne